Thomas Cooper Huckabee (born May 8, 1951) is an American film and television actor who appeared in The Funhouse, Urban Cowboy, and as Harrison in the 1993 film Gettysburg, among other roles.

Career
Huckabee played Buzz, one of the leading roles, in The Funhouse. He was Marshall, John Travolta's buddy in Urban Cowboy. He shared a starring role in the 1982 CBS made-for-TV movie Country Gold made in Nashville which also featured Loni Anderson, Linda Hamilton, and Earl Holliman. He was Henry Thomas Harrison, the spy, in Gettysburg.

He has also had several guest appearances on various TV series, including ER and The Shield. Huckabee turned in a memorable performance as Euple Byrd, the first husband of country music legend Tammy Wynette in the made-for-TV movie Stand By Your Man.
Huckabee also appeared in The Killers video for A Dustland Fairytale. Huckabee had a recurring role in the TV series True Blood and portrayed Joe Lee Mickens.

TV and filmography

References

External links

1951 births
American male film actors
Living people
Actors from Mobile, Alabama
American male television actors
20th-century American male actors
21st-century American male actors